Saint-Colomban Sportive Locminé is a French football club situated in Locminé, Brittany. As of the 2020–21 season, they play in the Championnat National 3, the fifth level of the French football league system.

History 
The club was founded by the Abbé Padrun in 1908.
Following this rise, the club was granted a municipal subsidy of 7,500 euros.

In the 2011–12 Coupe de France, the team managed to reach the round of 64 of the competition, but they lost 2–1 against Paris Saint-Germain after extra-time.

On 24 May 2014, after a defeat against the Stade Brestois reserve, Locminé went down in DH but was drafted following the announcement of the bankruptcy of Vesoul HSF. The following season, the club came down in DH.

Honours 
 Régional 1: 2001, 2004, 2011
 Coupe de Bretagne: 1992, 2004

References 

Football clubs in Brittany
Association football clubs established in 1908
1908 establishments in France
Sport in Morbihan

fr:Ligue de Bretagne de football